Deadlock is a detective novel by Sara Paretsky told in the first person by private eye (Vic) V. I. Warshawski.

Plot
Vic goes to the Chicago port to find out about her cousin Boom Boom's death. She believes that Boom Boom was killed. The police believe that this ex-Black Hawks hockey player died in  an accident. Vic starts digging for motive and evidence. After two attempts on her life, she finally thinks she has the murder solved but needs strong evidence. To get it, she goes to the yacht of a shipping magnate but is caught by the magnate while she is gathering evidence against him. He  confronts her and tells her she is going to die.

The author was given an award by the Friends of American Writers for the book.

References

External links
 Review in El Rincon Del Vago

1984 American novels
Detective novels
Novels set in Chicago
English-language novels
American novels adapted into films
Novels by Sarah Paretsky
American crime novels